Current Protocols is a series of laboratory manuals for life scientists. The first title, Current Protocols in Molecular Biology, was established in 1987 by the founding editors Frederick M. Ausubel, Roger Brent, Robert Kingston, David D. Moore, Jon Seidman, Kevin Struhl, and John A. Smith of the Massachusetts General Hospital Department of Molecular Biology and the Harvard Medical School Departments of Genetics and Biological Chemistry, along with Sarah Greene of Greene Publishing Associates The Current Protocols series entered into a partnership with by Wiley-Interscience, John Wiley and Sons, and was then acquired by Wiley in 1995, and has continued to introduce additional titles. Scientists contribute methods that are peer-reviewed by one of 18 editorial boards. The core content of each title is updated, and new material is added, on a quarterly basis. In 2009, the Current Protocols website was launched. The site features online versions of all of the texts, research tools, video protocols, and a blog. As of March, 2018, several Current Protocols titles are indexed in MEDLINE and searchable by PubMed: CP Molecular Biology, CP Immunology, CP Cell Biology, CP Protein Science, CP Microbiology.

Titles 
As of March, 2018, titles in the series included:

References

External links 
 

Science books